Becurtovirus is a genus of viruses, in the family Geminiviridae. Dicotyledonous plants serve as natural hosts. There are three species in this genus.

Taxonomy
The following three species are assigned to the genus:
Beet curly top Iran virus
Exomis microphylla latent virus
Spinach curly top Arizona virus

Structure
Viruses in Becurtovirus are non-enveloped, with icosahedral geometries, and T=1 symmetry. Genomes are circular and non-segmented, around 3.0kb in length.

Life cycle
Viral replication is nuclear. Entry into the host cell is achieved by penetration into the host cell. Replication follows the ssDNA rolling circle model. DNA-templated transcription is the method of transcription. The virus exits the host cell by nuclear pore export, and tubule-guided viral movement. Dicotyledonous plants serve as the natural host.

References

External links
 Viralzone: Becurtovirus
 ICTV

Geminiviridae
Virus genera